Alex Padilla (born February 14, 1971) is a former American racing driver.

Career 

Born and raised in Palestine, Texas - the child of Alejandro Padilla (born New Brunswick, NJ) and Alice Padilla (née Scott), born in North Carolina, he began his professional career in the Barber Saab Pro Series in 1992 and finished fourth in the championship. He also drove in the 24 Hours of Daytona for Alex Job Racing and finished 18th overall and 5th in class in a Porsche 911. In 1993 he captured 3 wins on his way to third place in the Barber Saab Pro Series. 1994 brought him to the Indy Lights series full-time (he had made his series debut in a one-off in 1992). Padilla won the pole in Vancouver and finished 7th in points. In 1995 Padilla could not secure a full-time ride after the first four races and competed in only 3 of the last 8 races but still managed to finish 11th in the championship. He returned to the series full-time in 1996 and 6th in points with a pair of runner-up finishes in the Detroit and Portland races. In 1998 he competed in the Latin American Indy Lights Panamericana series and finished 5th in points.

Personal life
He is of Cherokee, Filipino and Native Hawaiian descent.

All four of his grandparents were from the New England region, with one of his paternal ones being from Rhode Island.

At one point of his life he lived in Sacramento, California.

He has lived in Kelowna since 2021.

References

1971 births
American racing drivers
Indy Lights drivers
Living people
24 Hours of Daytona drivers
Barber Pro Series drivers
People from Palestine, Texas